In the run-up to the general election of 2010, several polling organisations carried out opinion polling in regards to voting intention in Great Britain (i.e. the UK excluding Northern Ireland, which is usually excluded from such voting intention surveys). Results of such polls are displayed below.

The election took place on 6 May 2010, coinciding with the local elections. The previous general election was held on 5 May 2005.

Tony Blair stood down as prime minister after 10 years in June 2007, and was succeeded by chancellor Gordon Brown. That autumn, the national media reported that an imminent general election was likely, putting all polling organisations, the press and political parties on an election footing, but Brown eventually announced that he would not seek a dissolution. According to many media and political figures, this was because he believed that Labour was likely to lose its majority in a snap general election, even though many opinion polls suggested that a fourth successive election win for Labour was likely, and this would potentially have ensured the Labour government's survival to the end of 2012. Brown has since claimed that Labour would have won but he did not believe an early election was in the national interest.

In the meantime, Michael Howard had stepped down as Tory leader after the 2005 general election, being succeeded by David Cameron. In January 2006, Charles Kennedy stepped down as leader of the Liberal Democrats to be succeeded by Menzies Campbell, who himself resigned at the end of the following year to be succeeded by Nick Clegg.

2006 had seen the Tories make gains in local elections, as well as enjoying their first consistent lead of the opinion polls in 14 years. 2007 had seen both the Tories and Labour lead the opinion polls, but 2008 saw the Tories build up a wide lead as the Labour government's support slumped in the face of the economic crisis. Labour also suffered huge losses in local elections, as well as suffering by-election defeats, with the Tories, Liberal Democrats and Scottish National Party all enjoying success at Labour's expense. This trend continued throughout 2009 as the recession deepened and unemployment continued to soar. The expenses scandal also had an adverse effect on the Labour government's dwindling popularity, although MPs from other parties were also shamed in the scandal. Labour also performed dismally at the 2009 European Parliament election, and opinion polls pointed towards a heavy defeat in the event of a general election. The previous two general elections had both been held at four-year intervals, but there would be no general election in 2009.

On 6 April 2010, Brown called a general election for 6 May – with the opinion polls still showing a Conservative lead, although most of the polls showed that a Conservative majority was unlikely, suggesting that Labour could still continue in a minority or coalition government. In the event, the Tories enjoyed the largest share of votes and seats, but came 20 seats short of a majority. On 11 May, Brown tendered his resignation as prime minister to the Queen, and recommended that Cameron should be invited to form the next government. Cameron duly did so, forming a government in coalition with the Liberal Democrats, and making Clegg deputy prime minister.

Background 
Since each MP is elected separately by the first past the post voting system, it is impossible to precisely project a clear election outcome from overall national shares of the vote. Not only can individual constituencies vary markedly from overall voting trends, but individual countries and regions within the nation may have a very different electoral contest that is not properly reflected in overall share of the vote figures.

Therefore, the first past the post system means that the number of MPs elected may not reflect the overall popular vote share across the parties. Thus, it is not necessarily the party with the largest share of the popular vote that ends up with the largest number of MPs. (See details of the elections in 1951 and February 1974) Since 1935 no party has achieved more than 50% of the popular vote in a British general election. The voting system favours parties with relatively concentrated support: a widely distributed vote leaves a party at risk of getting a large vote share but doing poorly in terms of numbers of seats (as the SDP–Liberal Alliance did in the 1980s), whereas parties with localised votes can win seats with a relatively small share of the vote.

That said, in previous elections, approximate forecasting of results were achieved by assuming that the swing in each individual constituency will be the same across the country. This system, known as uniform national swing (UNS) is used by much of the media in Britain to assess and extrapolate electoral fortunes from opinion poll data, though there has been criticism that such predictions may be naive and unreliable, even from providers of such data. By using UNS projections, several media commentators and politicians have suggested that significant swings towards the Liberal Democrats in the opinion polls may not necessarily amount to significant gains in terms of parliamentary seats, including predictions that even if the Liberal Democrats had the most votes, and Labour the least, it could be the case that Labour retains the most seats while the Lib Dems have the fewest.

Normally governments can easily survive for a full parliamentary term on a majority of more than 20 seats over all other parties. Below that level there is a danger of by-elections and MPs crossing the floor of the House of Commons reducing the government to a minority such that it would be at increased risk of losing a vote of no confidence.

Polling since 2005
Immediately following the previous general election, the Labour Party held a double-digit lead in opinion polls. However, over the course of 2005, this lead was eroded somewhat. By December, the Conservative Party showed its first small leads in opinion polls following the controversial 90 days detention proposals and the election of David Cameron as Conservative leader.

In early 2006, opinion polls were increasingly mixed with small leads given alternately to Labour and Conservative. From the May 2006 local elections, in which Labour suffered significant losses, the Conservatives took a small single-digit lead in opinion polls. This was the first consistent lead of the opinion polls that the Conservatives had enjoyed for 14 years.

Labour regained the lead in June 2007, following the resignation of Tony Blair as prime minister and the selection of Gordon Brown as his successor. Brown resisted calls from his party to hold a general election, despite opinion polls suggesting that Labour was capable of being re-elected at this stage. From November 2007, however, the Conservatives again took the lead and, from then, extended their lead into double digits, particularly in response to the MPs' expenses scandal and the economic recession along with the increased unemployment that resulted from it, although there was some evidence that the lead narrowed slightly towards the end of 2008 and again in late 2009. By the end of February 2010, Ipsos MORI, ICM, YouGov and ComRes polls had all found a sufficient narrowing of the Conservative lead for media speculation about a hung parliament to return - scenario which could have allowed Labour to cling onto power in a minority or coalition government.

From 15 April 2010, following the first televised debate of the party leaders, however, polling data changed dramatically, with the Lib Dem vote proportion rising to 28–33%, and the Conservative vote proportion falling. In some polls, the Liberal Democrats took the lead from the Conservatives by a narrow margin which was unprecedented in the period since the Lib Dems were founded in 1988. Under UNS projections, this made a hung parliament highly probable, if Lib Dem performance had persisted.

Following the second debate on 22 April the polls, on average, placed the Conservatives in the lead on 33%, the Liberal Democrats in second on 30% and Labour in third on 28%. If these polls had reflected the election day results on a uniform swing nationwide, Labour would have had the most seats in a hung Parliament, and therefore it still appeared possible that Labour might remain in power as the main party in a minority or coalition government.

Exit poll
At 10 pm on election day, coinciding with the closure of the polls, the results of an exit poll collected for the BBC, Sky and ITV news services were announced. Data were gathered from individuals at 130 polling stations around the country. The results of the poll initially suggested a hung parliament with the Conservative Party 19 seats from a controlling majority; this was later adjusted to 21 seats. The distribution of seats amongst the Conservatives, Labour, Liberal Democrats and other parties was initially suggested to be 307, 255, 59 and 29 respectively, although the seat numbers were later changed to 303, 251, 69, and 27 respectively.

Initial reaction to the exit poll by various commentators was of surprise at the apparent poor prospects for the Liberal Democrats because it was odds with many opinion polls undertaken in the previous weeks. However, the actual results showed that the exit poll was a good predictor.

A later BBC Exit poll (05:36 BST) predicted the Conservatives on 306, 20 short of an overall majority, Labour on 262, and Liberal Democrats on 55.

Graphical summaries

The following graph shows YouGov poll results since the calling of the general election.

The following graph shows ComRes poll results recorded over the period 11 April – 6 May 2010, including annotations of the three TV debates.

Poll results
Poll results are initially listed in reverse chronological order showing the most recent first, using the date the fieldwork was done, as opposed to the date of publication.

The figure given in the 'lead' column before the televised leaders' debates is the lead held by Labour or the Conservatives over the second placed of the two parties. For figures after the first debate, after which the Liberal Democrats were placed in first or second position in some polls, the second placed party is also noted in the column where applicable.

Most of the polling companies listed are members of the British Polling Council, and abide by its disclosure rules. BPIX is not a member of the BPC, and does not publish detailed methodology and findings.

2010

2009

2008

2007

2006

2005

See also
Opinion polling for the next United Kingdom general election
Opinion polling for the 2005 United Kingdom general election
2009 European Parliament election in the United Kingdom
List of political parties in the United Kingdom

Notes

P – The dates when the fieldwork for this poll was carried out is unknown, therefore the date of publication has been given.

External links
Ipsos Mori archive of all pollsters' polls
British Polling Council
Electoral Calculus
UK Polling Report Election Guide
ICM Polls
Populus Political Polls
YouGov Political Polls
ComRes Polls
Latest polling results and seat projections from Angus Reid Public Opinion

2010 United Kingdom general election
Opinion polling for United Kingdom general elections
Opinion polling for United Kingdom votes in the 2010s

nl:Opiniepeilingen voor de Britse Lagerhuisverkiezingen 2010